Nikola "Niki" Pilić (born 27 August 1939) is a Croatian former professional tennis player who competed for SFR Yugoslavia.

He was one of the Handsome Eight. Pilić was ranked world No. 6 in January 1968 and world No. 7 for 1967 by Lance Tingay of The Daily Telegraph.

Early life
Pilić was born in Split, Banovina of Croatia, Kingdom of Yugoslavia to Krsto Pilić and Danica Tomić-Ferić five days before the outbreak of World War II that began on 1 September 1939 with the German invasion of Poland.

The youngster took up tennis during the summer of 1952. Thirteen years of age at this point, he began practicing on the Firule tennis club clay courts in parallel to studying shipbuilding at the streamlined high school in Split. Upon graduating he attempted to enrol at a community college in Zagreb, but due to not meeting the entrance criteria ended up in Novi Sad where he studied government administration.

Tennis career
Pilic reached the semifinals of Wimbledon in 1967, beating Roy Emerson. Then open tennis arrived and Pilić was one of the Handsome Eight, a group of players signed by Lamar Hunt in 1968 for the newly formed professional World Championship Tennis (WCT) group.

In 1970, Pilić won the men's doubles title at the US Open with his French partner Pierre Barthès by defeating the Australians John Newcombe and Rod Laver in four sets. His best singles performance at a Grand Slam tournament came in 1973 when he reached the final of the French Open, losing to Ilie Năstase in straight sets.

Pilić was the catalyst to the 1973 Wimbledon boycott. In May 1973, the Yugoslav tennis federation alleged that Pilić had refused to represent them in a Davis Cup tie against New Zealand earlier that month. Pilić denied the charge, but was suspended by the federation, and the suspension was upheld by the ILTF, albeit decreased from nine months to one month, meaning that he could not enter the Wimbledon Championships. In protest at the suspension, 81 of Pilić's fellow professionals, organized into the Association of Tennis Professionals (ATP), and including 13 of the 16 seeds, withdrew from the 1973 Wimbledon Championships.

Grand Slam finals

Singles: 1 (1 runner-up)

Doubles: 2 (1 title, 1 runner-up)

Grand Slam singles performance timeline

Note: The Australian Open was held twice in 1977, in January and December.

Post-playing
After retiring from playing tennis professionally, Pilić began coaching and became the first captain to win the Davis Cup trophy for three nations: Germany in 1988, 1989 and 1993, Croatia in 2005 and Serbia in 2010. He's been working with Serbia Davis Cup team in the adviser role since 2007, and won the Davis Cup title in 2010.

He runs a tennis academy in Oberschleißheim near Munich where he resides. Players such as Michael Stich, Novak Djokovic, Ernests Gulbis and Anastasija Sevastova developed and came through the Pilic academy.

Personal
In 1970, Pilić married Serbian actress Mija Adamović. The couple has children together.

In 2020 he was awarded the Golden Medal of Merits of Republic of Serbia.

References

External links

 
 
 
 Tennis Academy Niki Pilic – Official site
 An interview in Jet Set magazine 

1939 births
Living people
Croatian expatriate sportspeople in Germany
Croatian male tennis players
Croatian tennis coaches
Tennis players from Split, Croatia
US Open (tennis) champions
Yugoslav expatriate sportspeople in Germany
Yugoslav male tennis players
Grand Slam (tennis) champions in men's doubles
Mediterranean Games gold medalists for Yugoslavia
Mediterranean Games bronze medalists for Yugoslavia
Competitors at the 1963 Mediterranean Games
Mediterranean Games medalists in tennis
Universiade medalists in tennis
Novak Djokovic coaches
Universiade gold medalists for Yugoslavia
Universiade silver medalists for Yugoslavia
Medalists at the 1961 Summer Universiade